Sunshine State of Mind is the third studio album by American rock band We the Kings.

Background
While writing new material, We the Kings used piano and acoustic guitars. Travis Clark explained that he "wanted all the songs to be able to be stripped down with acoustic and vocals, and [the band] built it off that."

Release
Sunshine State of Mind was released through S-Curve Records on July 5, 2011 on iTunes and July 12 everywhere else. "Say You Like Me" was released to mainstream radio on September 13, 2011. In February and March 2012 the band went on a co-headlining tour with Mayday Parade, with support from The Downtown Fiction and Anarbor.

Reception

The album received mixed to negative reviews from music journalists. It debuted at No. 45 on the US Billboard 200 and at No. 9 on the Rock Albums chart. This is the last album to feature bass player Drew Thomsen.

Track listing

Personnel
We the Kings
Travis Clark – lead vocals, rhythm guitar
Hunter Thomsen – lead guitar, backing vocals
Danny Duncan – drums
Drew Thomsen - Bass

References

External links

Sunshine State of Mind at YouTube (streamed copy where licensed)

2011 albums
We the Kings albums
S-Curve Records albums
Albums produced by S*A*M and Sluggo